Adeyemi Ambrose Afolahan (born 26 December 1949) was appointed the first Administrator of Taraba State, Nigeria in August 1991 after the state was created from part of the old Gongola State during the military regime of General Ibrahim Babangida.
He handed over to the elected civilian governor Jolly Nyame in January 1992 at the start of the Nigerian Third Republic.

Afolahan was born on  26 December 1949 in Ibadan, Oyo State. He studied in Nigeria and the United Kingdom.
Posts included deputy commandant, National War College, Abuja, Chief of Naval Operations and Chief of Naval Plans.

Speaking at a seminar in Lagos in May 2000, Afolahan called on Nigerian youths to abstain from sex or at least use condoms to ensure an AIDS-free society.
He became Chairman of the Ila Orangun Unity Movement.

References

Living people
1949 births
Nigerian Navy admirals
Governors of Taraba State
Yoruba military personnel
Yoruba people